Bay Head is a railway station in Bay Head, in Ocean County, New Jersey, United States. The station is served by trains on NJ Transit's North Jersey Coast Line, and it is the southern terminus for the line. The rail yard contains  of wetland inside the loop formed by the tracks used to turn around the trains. The rail yard borders Twilight Lake.  Parking is free at the Bay Head station although the lot is only about a fourth of the size of the lot at the next station, Point Pleasant Beach, which requires payment. 

This station is not listed as disabled accessible by NJ Transit. Passengers must use the train stairs to climb up to the cars or descend to street level. There is no ramp or platform to aid the handicapped in boarding. Weekend ridership to the Bay Head station rises during the summer as beachgoing vacationers take the train to the beach.  In May 2011, ticket vending machines were installed next to the station building at Bay Head.

Station layout
The station has a low-level side platform serving trains in both directions, most trains also use track one, the doors open at the street.

Bibliography

References

External links

NJ Transit Rail Operations stations
Railway stations in Ocean County, New Jersey
Stations on the North Jersey Coast Line
Former Pennsylvania Railroad stations
Former New York and Long Branch Railroad stations
Railway stations in the United States opened in 1882
1882 establishments in New Jersey